This article shows the qualification phase for 2017 CEV Women's Champions League. A total of 18 teams enter qualification round. During qualification, the winners keep on progressing until the last 4 teams standing join the 12 teams which have directly qualified to the main tournament League round based on the European Cups' Ranking List. All 14 teams which do not progress in qualification are allocated to different stages of the  2017 Women's CEV Cup.

Participating teams

 Agel Prostějov
 Calcit Ljubljana
 Dinamo Krasnodar
 Eczacibasi VitrA Istanbul
 HPK Hämeenlinna
 Khimik Yuzhny
 Kohila VC
 KV Drita Gjilan
 Linamar - Békéscsabai RSE
 Liu Jo Nordmeccanica Modena
 Luka Bar
 Maccabi Haifa
 Maritza Plovdiv
 Minchanka Minsk
 MKS Dąbrowa Górnicza
 RC Cannes
 Vizura Beograd
 ŽOK Bimal-Jedinstvo Brčko

First round
Home-Away matches.
Winners advances to the Second round. Losers will compete in 32nd Finals of 2017 Women's CEV Cup.
All times are local.

|}

First leg

|}

Second leg

|}

Second round
16 teams will compete in the second round.
Winners will advance to the third round. Losers will compete in 16th Finals of 2017 Women's CEV Cup.
All times are local.

|}

First leg

|}

Second leg

|}

Third round
Second round winners will be paired up one another.
Winners will advance to the League round. Losers will compete in 8th Finals of 2017 Women's CEV Cup.
All times are local.

|}

First leg

|}

Second leg

|}

League round

Drawing of lots was held on 9 June 2016

Pool Summary

References

Qualification
2016 in women's volleyball